Rissne metro station is a station on the blue line of the Stockholm metro, located in Rissne, Sundbyberg Municipality. The station was inaugurated on 18 August 1985 as part of the extension between Västra skogen and Rinkeby. There is a subtitled timeline of historic events in the station from 3000 BC to the 1980s by Madeleine Dranger and Rolf H Reimers.

Gallery

References

External links
Images of Rissne

Blue line (Stockholm metro) stations
Railway stations opened in 1985
1985 establishments in Sweden